Paul Rennell is a former football (soccer) player who represented New Zealand at international level.

Rennell played four official A-international matches for New Zealand in 1967, the first three of which were at the Vietnam National Day Soccer Tournament. His debut was a 3–5 loss to trans-Tasman neighbours Australia on 5 November 1967, followed by a 3–1 win over Singapore on 8 November and a 1–5 loss to South Vietnam on 10 November 1967. His final official appearance was an 8–2 win over Malaysia on 16 November 1967.

References 

Year of birth missing (living people)
Living people
New Zealand association footballers
New Zealand international footballers
Association footballers not categorized by position